

Championship Performance Table

Here is a list of all of KF Tirana's seasons from 1930 till most recent season. This list shows where they finished the season, how many goals they scored and conceded, how many wins draws and losses they had throughout the season, goal difference, winning difference, earned points and matches played. The list below also displays the results from three Second World War championships along period 1939-1942, however, these championships are not officially recognized from AFA. 

 Results from 1939, 1940 & 1942 Superliga seasons are not officially recognized from AFA.

Winning squads

 1930:
  Rudolf Gurashi, Abdullah Shehri, Irfan Gjinali, Xhelal Kashari, Vasil Kajano,
  Gjon Sabati, Llazar Miha, Mark Gurashi, Bexhet Jolldashi, Shefqet Ndroqi,
  Isuf Dashi, Selman Stermasi, Adem Karapici, Hysen Kusi, Mustafa Begolli,
  Hilmi Kosova, Emil Hajnali, Rexhep Maci. Coach: Selman Stermasi
 1931:
  Rudolf Gurashi, Vasfi Samimi, Abdullah Sherri, Sabit Coku, Vasil Kajano,
  Bexhet Jolldashi, Irfan Gjinali, Muhamet Agolli, Gjon Sabati, Adem Karapici,
  Isuf Dashi, Hysen Kusi, Hilmi Kosova, Mark Gurashi, Halim Begeja, Emil
  Hajnali, Llazar Miha, Selman Stermasi. Coach: Selman Stermasi
 1932:
  Abdullah Shehri, Bexhet Jolldashi, Muhamet Agolli, Vasil Kajani, Rifat
  Jolldashi, Hyse Kusi, Adem Karapici, Hasan Maluci, Halim Begeja, Selman
  Stermasi, Emil Hajnali, Isuf Dashi, Haki Korca, Hajri Jegeni, Gjon Sabati.
  Coach: Selman Stermasi
 1934:
  Rudolf Gurashi, Sabit Coku, Foto Janku, Hasan Maluci, Ludovik Jakova,
  Hamit Keci, Adem Karapici, Selman Stermasi, Riza Lushta, Maliq Petrela,
  Halim Begeja, Haki Korca, Luci Stamati, Mark Gurashi. Coach: Selman Stermasi
 1936:
  Rudolf Gurashi, Qamil Zebishti, Asti Hobdari, Foto Janku, Sabit Coku,
  Ramazan Hima, Hysen Kusi, Adem Karapici, Ludovik Jakova, Luci Stamati,
  Myslym Alla, Hot Mirdita, Riza Lushta, Maliq Petrela, Emil Hajnali,
  Mark Gurashi, Skender Gjinali. Coach: Selman Stermasi
 1937:
  Rudolf Gurashi, Qamil Zebishti, Prokop Skuka, Foto Janku, Sllave Llambi,
  Adem Karapici, Mico Plluska, Ludovik Jakova, Hasan Balla, Hot Mirdita,
  Riza Lushta, Mark Gurashi, Emil Hajnali, Ramiz Kashariqi, Maliq Petrela,
  Zyber Lisi, Myslym Alla. Coach: Selman Stermasi
 1964-65:
  Nuri Bylyku, Rexhep Bathorja, Luigj Bytyci, Skender Halili, Gezim Kasmi,
  Fatmir Frasheri, Niko Xhacka, Skender Hya, Pavllo Bukoviku, Bahri Ishka,
  Ali Mema, Bujar Tafaj, Ilir Elini, Gezim Saraci, Osman Mema, Vaso Konomi,
  Tomorr Gjoka, Aurel Verria. Coach: Myslym Alla
 1965-66:
  Josif Kazanxhi, Bahri Ishka, Ilir Elini, Bujar Tafaj, Fatmir Frasheri,
  Skender Halili, Gezim Kasmi, Nuri Bylyku, Ali Mema, Luigj Bytyci, Niko
  Xhacka, Tomorr Gjoka, Pavllo Bukoviku, Rexhep Bathorja, Skender Hyka,
  Gezim Saraci, Osman Mema, Vaso Konomi, Aurel Verria. Coach: Myslym Alla
 1968:
  Bujar Tafaj, Shpetim Habibi, Fatmir Frasheri, Perikli Dhales, Osman Mema,
  Ali Mema, Luigj Bytyci, Niko Xhacka, Pavllo Bukoviku, Josif Kazanxhi,
  Skender Hyka, Bahri Ishka, Petraq Ikonomi, Arben Cela, Petrit Nurishmi,
  Tomorr Gjoka, Gezim Kasmi. Coach: Myslym Alla
 1969-70:
  Bujar Tafaj, Bahri Ishka, Perikli Dhales, Pavllo Bukoviku, Josif Kazanxhi,
  Ali Mema, Petrit Nurishmi, Petraq Ikonomi, Gezim Kasmi, Arben Cela,
  Skender Hyka, Fatmir Frasheri, Niko Xhacka, Durim Hatibi, Luigj Bytyci,
  Osman Mema, Lulzim Shala, Tomorr Gjoka. Coach: Myslym Alla
 1981-82:
  Shkelqim Muca, Bujar Muca, Gjergj Dinella, Besnik Armadhi, Ilir Metani,
  Arben Vila, Luan Sengla, Bujar Vladi, Arjan Bimo, Bedri Omuri, Adnan
  Demneri, Antonin Naci, Millan Baci, Agustin Kola, Leonard Liti, Sulejman
  Mema. Coach: Enver Shehu
 1984-85:
  Mirel Josa, Arben Minga, Millan Baci, Sulejman Mema, Astrit Ramadani,
  Anesti Stoja, Halim Mersini, Agustin Kola, Petrit Roga, Skender Hodja,
  Artur Lekbello, Bedri Omuri, Shkelqim Muca, Arjan Bimo, Leonard Liti,
  Artan Bylyku. Coach: Enver Shehu
 1987-88:
  Halim Mersini, Bujar Sharra, Fatos Daja, Skender Hodja, Artur Lekbello,
  Krenar Alimehmeti, Fatjon Kepi, Ardian Ruci, Bedri Omuri, Mirel Josa,
  Anesti Stoja, Shkelqim Muca, Arben Minga, Astrit Ramadani, Artan Sako,
  Florian Riza, Agustin Kola, Sinan Bardhi, Leonard Liti, Albert Fortuzi,
  Fatbardh Ismali, David Papadhopulli. Coach: Shyqyri Rreli
 1988-89:
  Halim Mersini, Bujar Sharra, Astrit Ramadani, Skender Hodja, Artur Lekbello,
  Krenar Alimehmeti, Sinan Bardhi, Leonard Liti, Bedri Omuri, Mirel Josa,
  Anesti Stoja, Shkelqim Muca, Arben Minga, Agustin Kola, Florian Riza,
  Artan Sako, Fatos Daja, Ardian Ruci, Fatbardh Ismaili, Fatjon Kepi, Shkelqim
  Lekbello, Renis Hyka, Artan Luzi, Ardian Mema. Coach: Shyqyri Rreli
 1994-95:
  Auron Miloti, Indrit Fortuzi, Erion Kasmi, Thoma Kokuri, Saimir Malko,
  Alpin Gallo, Nevil Dede, Afrim Tole, Anesti Stoja, Ardian Mema, Dritan
  Baholli, Artan Kukli, Edmond Sula, Sokol Prenga, Amarildo Zela, Klorend
  Fejzolli, Arben Minga, Agustin Kola, Endi Hyka, Frenkli Dhales, Blendi
  Nallbani, Eldorado Merkoci, Lulian Mulleti. Coach: Shkelqim Muca
 1995-96:
  Auron Miloti, Nordik Ruhi, Saimir Malko, Alpin Gallo, Arben Minga, Krenar
  Alimehmeti, Ardian Mema, Artan Kukli, Blendi Nallbani, Eriton Kasmi,
  Florian Riza, Sokol Bulku, Eldorado Merkoci, Nevil Dede, Edmond Sula,
  Endi Hyka, Nikolin Coclli, Alban Bushi, Elvin Cassli, Indrit Fortuzi,
  Devis Ismaili, Agustin Kola, Skender Mergjyshi, Lulian Mulleti, Taulant
  Stermasi. Coach: Sulejman Mema
 1996-97:
  Auron Miloti, Blendi Nallbani, Lulzim Hushi, Alpin Gallo, Nevil Dede,
  Krenar Alimehmeti, Ardian Mema, Artan Kukli, Alvaro Zalla, Florian Riza,
  Nikolin Coclli, Eldorado Merkoci, Agustin Kola, Sokol Bulku, Indrit Fortuzi,
  Devis Ismaili, Sparti Domi, Taulant Stermasi, Nordik Ruhi, Rigels Kapllani,
  Eriton Kasmi, Alban Bushi, Elton Shaba, Elvis Sina. Coach: Enver Shehu
 1998-99:
  Ardian Mema, Nikolin Coclli, Klodian Duro, Saimir Malko, Devi Muka, Alket
  Zeqo, Alpin Gallo, Blendi Nallbani, Krenar Alimehmeti, Alban Tafaj,
  Eldorado Merkoci, Sokol Prenga, Nevil Dede, Rezart Dabulla, Elvis Sina,
  Sokol Ishka, Ervin Bulku, Sokol Bulu, Isli Hidi, Taulant Stermasi, Oltion
  Osmani, Marian Liti, Agron Xhafa, Saimir Iljazi, Ervin Karaj, Rezart Karaj,
  Nordik Ruhi, Devis Ismaili. Coach: Sulejman Mema
 1999-00:
  Blendi Nallbani, Elvis Sina, Rezart Dabulla, Nevil Dede, Krenar Alimehmeti,
  Alban Tafaj, Ervin Bulku, Enkli Memishi, Zoltan Kenesei (HUN), Johan Driza,
  Anesti Vito, Peter Sutori (HUN), Erion Rizvanolli, Florian Riza, Isli Hidi,
  Sokol Bulku, Alpin Gallo, Sokol Ishka, Julian Kapaj, Gentian Lici, Ardian
  Mema, Sokol Prenga, Nordik Ruhi, Fatjon Ymeri, Laszlo Vukovics (HUN), Matyas
  Lazar (HUN). Coach: Shkelqim Muca
 2002-03:
  Emmanuel Ndubuisi Egbo, Isli Hidi, Glend Tafaj, Alban Tafaj, Nevil Dede,
  Elvis Sina, Rezart Dabulla, Gentian Hajdari, Rudi Vata, Jan Veenhof,
  Suad Lici, Ansi Agolli, Florian Manastirliu, Sajmir Patushi, Fjodor Xhafa,
  Ardian Mema, Ervin Bulku, Sokol Bulku, Erald Begolli, Redi Jupi, Daniele
  Zaccanti, Devi Muka, Arian Veraj, Sokol Prenga, Indrit Fortuzi, Eldorado
  Merkoci, Mahir Halili. Coach: Fatmir Frasheri
 2003-04:
  Emmanuel Egbo, Isli Hidi, Gentian Tafaj, Alban Tafaj, Nevil Dede, Elvis
  Sina, Rezart Dabulla, Gentian Hajdari, Luan Pinari, Alban Muca, Suad Lici,
  Ansi Agolli, Saimir Patushi, Sokol Bulku, Devi Muka, Indrit Fortuzi,
  Mahir Halili, Eldorado Merkoci, Fjodor Xhafa. Coach: Mirel Josa
 2004-05:
  Blendi Nallbani, Elvis Sina, Alban Tafaj, Ervin Bulku,
  Altin Rraklli, Eldorado Merkoçi, Devi Muka, Ansi Agolli, Gentian Hajdari,
  Egert Bakalli, Fjodor Xhafa, Saimir Patushi,
  Geri Çipi, Isli Hidi, Rezart Dabulla, Ervin Fakaj, Ardit Beqiri, Ardian Behari. Coach: Sulejman Starova
 2006-07:
  Isli Hidi, Elvis Sina, Orjand Abazaj, Nevil Dede, Errand Xhafa,
  Endrit Vrapi, Devi Muka, Hetlem Çapja, Jetmir Sefa, Egert Bakalli,
  Jahmir Hyka, Klodian Duro, Daniel Xhafaj, Indrit Fortuzi
  Blendi Nallbani, Gentian Hajdari, Erald Deliallisi, Florenc Arapi, Eldorado Merkoçi. Coach: Sulejman Starova
 2008-09:
  Blendi Nallbani, Abraham Alechenwu, Bledar Devolli, Rezart Dabulla,
  Tefik Osmani, Entonio Pashaj, Laurent Mohellebi, Jetmir Sefa, Arbër Abilaliaj,
  Blerti Hajdari, Sabien Lilaj, Andi Lila, Pece Korunovski,
  Migen Metani, Gerard Tusha, Nertil Ferraj, Devi Muka. Coach: Alban Tafaj
 2019–20:
  Ilion Lika, Marsel Ismailgeci, Tefik Osmani, Andi Lila,
  Albi Doka, Kristi Vangjeli, Gentian Muça, Elton Calé, Winful Cobbinah,
  Jurgen Çelhaka, Erjon Hoxhallari, Edon Hasani, Agustin Torassa, Erando Karabeci, Ismael Dunga,
  Ernest Muçi, Mario Morina, Grent Halili, Michael Ngoo, Idriz Batha. Coach: Emmanuel Egbo
 2021-22:
  Ilion Lika, Kristijan Toshevski, Gentian Muça, Filip Najdovski, Enes Kuka, Engjëll Hoti, Ennur Totre, 
  Michael Ngoo, Vesel Limaj, Arbër Bytyqi, Marsel Ismailgeci, Aldi Gjumsi, Florjan Përgjoni, Redon Xhixha,
  Jocelin Behiratche, Erion Hoxhallari, Marlind Nuriu, Devid de Silva, Mario Beshiraj, 
  Dijar Nikqi, Realf Zhivanaj, Ardit Toli, Visar Bekaj, Taulant Seferi. Coach: Orges Shehi

Head-to-head stats

Below are head-to-head results of KF Tirana versus 44 opponents participated in Albanian Superliga from 1930 till present.

 Data correct until 14.05.2022 (34th Rnd)

Home & Away

Vllaznia

Flamurtari

Teuta

Elbasani

Besa

Skënderbeu

Shkumbini

Apolonia

Tomori

Lushnja

Laçi

Luftëtari

Kastrioti

Naftëtari

Bylis

Besëlidhja

Pogradeci

Recent Seasons

WH = Home wins

DH = Home draws

LH = Home losses

GH = Home goals

WA = Away wins

DA = Away draws

LA = Away losses

GA =- Away goals

 Data correct until 14.05.2022 (34th Rnd)

Biggest League wins

 KF Tirana-KS Elbasani 6-0 (01.05.1932) KS Elbasani-KF Tirana 2-9 (12.06.1932) KF Tirana-KS Elbasani 9-0 (17.06.1934) KF Tirana-KS Elbasani 9-0 (17.06.1952) KF Tirana-KS Elbasani 8-1 (1968) KF Tirana-KS Elbasani 6-1 (15.04.2011)
 KF Tirana-KS Teuta 9-0 (15.04.1934) KF Tirana-KS Teuta 8-0 (16.05.1937) KF Tirana-KS Teuta 5-0 (2007)
 KF Tirana-KS Flamurtari 8-0 (29.04.1934) KF Tirana-KS Flamurtari 11-0 (05.07.1936)
 KF Tirana-KS Besëlidhja 11-0 (06.06.1937)
 KF Tirana-KS Pogradeci 8-0 (24.10.1937) KF Tirana-KS Pogradeci 9-2 (1950) KS Pogradeci-KF Tirana 0-6 (1950) KS Pogradeci-KF Tirana 1-8 (1953)
 Naftëtari-KF Tirana 0-6 (1951) KF Tirana-Naftëtari 6-0 (1970) KF Tirana-Naftëtari 6-0 (1987)
 Dinamo Vlorë-KF Tirana 0-6 (1952
 Luftëtari-KF Tirana 0-6 (1945) KF Tirana-Luftëtari 7-1 (1951) KF Luftëtari-KF Tirana 0-5 (07.06.2020)
 Erzeni-KF Tirana 0-6 (1952) KF Tirana-Erzeni 11-0 (1966)
 KF Spartaku Tiranë-KF Tirana 0-6 (1957)
 KF Tirana-KS Lushnja 7-1 (1962) KF Tirana-KS Lushnja 7-0 (1988) KF Tirana-KS Lushnja 7-1 (2001) KS Lushnja-KF Tirana 0-6 (2004)
 KF Tirana-Partizani 7-3 (1985)
 KF Tirana-KS Albpetrol 8-0 (1998)
 KF Tirana-KS Apolonia 6-0 (1986) KF Tirana-KS Apolonia 7-0 (2000)
 KF Tirana-KF Bylis 6-0 (2002) KF Tirana-KF Bylis 6-2 (2009)
 KF Tirana-KS Besa 7-1 (2004)
 KF Tirana-KF Laci 6-0 (2005)
 KF Tirana-KS Kastrioti 7-3 (2007)

Biggest League defeats

 Partizani-KF Tirana 8-0 (1947) Partizani-KF Tirana 6-0 (1950) Partizani-KF Tirana 6-0 (1951)
 KF Tirana-KS Vllaznia 0-6 (1947) KS Vllaznia-KF Tirana 6-0 (1947)
 KF Tirana-KS Skenderbeu Korce 0-6 (1947)
 Dinamo Tiranë-KF Tirana 6-0 (1951)
 Dinamo Shkodër-KF Tirana 6-0 (1955)
 KS Besa-KF Tirana 7-1 (1992)
 KS Lushnja-KF Tirana 6-1 (1998)

Also look

KF Tirana Statistics in Albanian Cup

References

Superliga
Albanian football club statistics
Association football league records by opponent